The 2006 FIVB Volleyball World League was the 17th edition of the annual men's international volleyball tournament, played by 16 countries from 14 July to 27 August 2006. The Final Round was held in Moscow, Russia.

Pools composition

Intercontinental round
The Final Round hosts Russia, the winners of each pool and a wild card chosen by the FIVB will qualify for the Final Round. If Russia are ranked first in Pool C, the team ranked second of Pool C will qualify for the Final Round.

Pool A

|}

|}

Pool B

|}

|}

Pool C

|}

|}

Pool D

|}

|}

Final round
Venue:  Luzhniki Small Sports Arena, Moscow, Russia
All times are Moscow Summer Time (UTC+04:00).

Pool play

Pool E

|}

|}

Pool F

|}

|}

Playoff
The results were included in the standings of the Pool E and F.

|}

Final four

Semifinals

|}

3rd place match

|}

Final

|}

Final standing

Awards

Most Valuable Player
  Gilberto Godoy Filho
Best Scorer
  Sébastien Ruette
Best Spiker
  Matey Kaziyski
Best Blocker
  Vincent Montméat

Best Server
  André Nascimento
Best Setter
  Andrey Zhekov
Best Libero
  Aleksey Verbov

External links
Official website

FIVB Volleyball World League
FIVB World League
Volleyball
2006 in Russian sport